Highway 105 in Nova Scotia represents the Cape Breton Island leg of the Trans-Canada Highway.

In 2010, the provincial government named the entire highway Mabel and Alexander Graham Bell Way in honour of Mabel Gardiner Hubbard and her husband Alexander Graham Bell, who resided and are buried at Beinn Bhreagh near Baddeck.

Route description

The highway travels northeast from Port Hastings along the base of a group of mountains known as "The Big Ridge" to Whycocomagh. It then follows the north shore of Bras d'Or Lake, bypassing Baddeck on a short Super two controlled access segment. Still running in a general northeast direction, at St. Anns the highway begins ascending the west slope of Kelly's Mountain on the Cape Dauphin Peninsula. Highway 105 descends the east slope of Kelly's Mountain using a series of sharp turns including a 180° hairpin turn at New Harris Forks before crossing the Great Bras d'Or Channel of Bras d'Or Lake on the Seal Island Bridge. The road crosses Boularderie Island using another short Super two controlled access segment and then runs southeast as an uncontrolled access road through the villages of Bras d'Or and Florence.  Highway 105 regains controlled access for the final  to its eastern terminus at the Marine Atlantic ferry terminal in North Sydney where travellers can continue to Newfoundland.

With some minor exceptions noted above, the highway is two lanes and uncontrolled access.  In addition, there are two intersections controlled by traffic lights in Florence.

The Cabot Trail, which is usually used to describe a different road, is signed along a portion of Highway 105 between Nyanza and St. Anns so that the signed route forms a loop.

History

Highway 105 is descended from the former Trunk 5, which no longer exists; Highway 105 follows the old Trunk 5 alignment, using present Routes 205, 305 and roads named after it to serve areas bypassed by Highway 105. The 105 name was applied in 1970.

Trunk 5 was a provincial trunk road in Victoria County and the Cape Breton Regional Municipality between Boularderie East and Millville Boularderie on Boularderie Island in Nova Scotia. The route, known as Millville Highway, was the main highway before Nova Scotia Highway 105 opened. It originally extended from Sydney River to Port Hawkesbury. It is now commonly known as Old Route 5.

Exit list

References

External links

105
Nova Scotia 105
Limited-access roads in Canada
105
105
105